The prix Guillaume Apollinaire is a French poetry prize first awarded in 1941. It was named in honour of French writer Guillaume Apollinaire. It annually recognizes a collection of poems for its originality and modernity.

Members of the jury 
The members of jury of the Guillaume Apollinaire prize are elected for life. Since the last renewal (2011), the board members are:

 Charles Dobzynski (1929–2014) – president
 Jean-Pierre Siméon (1950–) – general secretary
 Marc Alyn (1937–)
 Marie-Claire Bancquart (1932–)
 Linda Maria Baros (1981–)
 Tahar Ben Jelloun (1944–)
 Zéno Bianu (1950–)
 Georges-Emmanuel Clancier (1914–) 
 Philippe Delaveau (1950–) 
 Guy Goffette (1947–)
 Bernard Mazo (1939–2012)
 Jean Portante (1950–)
 Robert Sabatier (1923–2012)

Winners 
The prize has been awarded 9 times to poets for all of their work: Paul Gilson, Pierre Seghers, Marcel Béalu, Vincent Monteiro, Luc Estang, Léopold Sédar Senghor, Jean-Claude Renard, Yves Martin, and Claude Roy.

1940s
 1941: Just Calveyrach for Guyane, Îles de Lérins
 1942: Roger Rabiniaux for Les Faubourgs du ciel, Profils Litt. Fr.
 1943: Yves Salgues for Le Chant de Nathanael, Profils Litt. Fr.
 1944 to 1946 : pas de désignation
 1947: Hervé Bazin for Jour, Iles de Lérins
 1948: Jean L'Anselme for Le Tambour de ville, LEC, éd. Contemporaines, and Rouben Melik for Passeur d'horizon, Îles de Lérins
 1949: no designation
1950s
 1950: Paul Chaulot D'autres terres, Îles de Lérins
 1951: Paul Gilson for all his work
 1952: Alain Bosquet for Langue morte, 
 1953: Jean Malrieu for Préface à l'amour, Cahiers du Sud and Armand Lanoux for Colporteur, Seghers
 1954: André de Richaud for Le Droit d'asile, Seghers
 1956: Robert Sabatier for Les Fêtes solaires, Albin Michel
 1957: Jacques Baron for Les Quatre temps, Seghers
 1957: Gilbert Trolliet for La Colline, Seghers|
 1958: Jean Rousselot for L'Agrégation du temps, Seghers
 1959: Luc Bérimont for L'Herbe à tonnerre, Seghers, and Pierre Seghers for all his work
1960s
 1960: Marcel Béalu and Vincent Monteiro for all their work
 1961: Jean Breton for Chair et soleil, La Table Ronde
 1962: Jeanne Kieffer for Cette Sauvage lumière, Gallimard
 1963: Jean Bancal for Le Chemin des hommes, Silvaire
 1964: Jean Desmeuzes for Ballade en Sol majeur, Millas-Martin
 1965: Robert Lorho (pseudonym: Lionel Ray) for Légendaire, Seghers
 1966: Catherine Tolstoï for Ce que savait la rose, Seghers
 1967: Lorand Gaspar for Le Quatrième état de la matière, Flammarion
 1968: Luc Estang for all his work
 1969: Albert Fabre for La Lumière est nommée, Seghers
1970s
 1970: Pierre Dalle Nogare for Corps imaginaire, Flammarion
 1971: Gaston Bonheur for Chemin privé, Flammarion
 1972: Serge Michenaud for Scorpion Orphée, éditions Guy Chambelland
 1973: Marc Alyn for Infini au-delà, Flammarion
 1974: Léopold Sédar Senghor for all his work
 1975: Charles Le Quintrec for Jeunesse de dieu, Albin Michel
 1976: Bernard Noël for Treize cases du je, Flammarion
 1977: Édouard Maunick for Ensoleillé vif, 
 1978: Jean-Claude Renard for all his work
 1979: Jean Laugier for Rituel pour une ode, éditions Caractères
1980s
 1980: Vénus Khoury-Ghata for Les Ombres et leurs cris, Belfond
 1981: Gaston Miron for L'Homme rapaillé, Maspéro
 1982: Jean Orizet for Le Voyageur absent, Grasset
 1983:  for La Seconde porte, Rougerie
 1984: Pierrette Micheloud for Les Mots, la pierre, La Braconnière
 1985: Jean-Vincent Verdonnet for Ce qui demeure, Rougerie
 1986: Claude-Michel Cluny for Asymétries, La Différence
 1987: Yves Broussard for Nourrir le feu, Sud-Poésie
 1988: James Sacré for Une Fin d'après-midi à Marrakech, André Dimanche
 1989: Philippe Delaveau for Eucharis, éditions Gallimard
1990s
 1990: Jacques Gaucheron for Entre mon ombre et la lumière, éditions Messidor
 1991: Yves Martin for all his work
 1992: François de Cornière for Tout cela
 1993: René Depestre for Anthologie personnelle, Actes Sud
 1994: Jean-Pierre Siméon for Le Sentiment du monde, Cheyne
 1995: Claude Roy for all his work
 1996: Patrice Delbourg for L'Ampleur du désastre, Le Cherche midi
 1997: Richard Rognet for Lutteur sans triomphe, L'Estocade
 1998: Anise Koltz for Le Mur du son, Éditions phi, Luxembourg
 1999: Claude Mourthé for Dit plus bas, Le Castor astral
2000s
 2000: Alain Jouffroy for C'est aujourd'hui toujours, Gallimard
 2001: Alain Lance for Temps criblé, Obsidiane/Le Temps qu'il fait
 2002: Claude Adelen for Soleil en mémoire, Dumerchez
 2003: François Montmaneix for Les Rôles invisibles, Le Cherche midi
 2004: Jacques Darras for Vous n'avez pas le vertige, Gallimard/L'Arbalète
 2005: Bernard Chambaz for Été, Flammarion
 2006: Jean-Baptiste Para for La Faim des ombres, Obsidiane
 2007: Linda Maria Baros for La Maison en lames de rasoir, Cheyne
 2008: Alain Borer for Icare & I don't, Éditions du Seuil
 2009: Jacques Ancet for L'Identité obscure, Lettres Vives
2010s
 2010: Jean-Marie Barnaud for Fragments d'un corps incertain, Cheyne
 2011: Jean-Claude Pirotte for Cette âme perdue, Le Castor astral and Autres Séjours, Le Temps qu'il fait
 2012: Valérie Rouzeau for Vrouz, La Table ronde
 2013: Frédéric Jacques Temple for Phares, balises & feux brefs, suivi de Périples, Bruno Doucey
 2014: Askinia Mihaylova for Ciel à perdre, Gallimard
 2015: Liliane Wouters for Derniers feux sur terre, Editions Le Taillis Pré, and for all her work
 2016:  for all his work, on the occasion of the publication of his collection Voix entre Voix, L'herbe qui tremble
 2017:  for Flamenco: les souliers de la Joselito, Les fondeurs de brique/Dernier Télégramme
 2018: Cécile Coulon for Les Ronces, Le Castor astral
 2019: Olivier Barbarant for Un grand instant, Champ Vallon

External links 
 
 Prix Guillaume-Apollinaire on La Lettre du libraire
 Prix Guillaume-Apollinaire sur Prix-litteraires.net

French poetry awards
Awards established in 1941
1941 establishments in France
Guillaume Apollinaire